Carl Dean Radle (June 18, 1942 – May 30, 1980) was an American bassist who toured and recorded with many of the most influential recording artists of the late 1960s and 1970s. He was posthumously inducted to the Oklahoma Music Hall of Fame in 2006.

Biography 

Radle was best known for his long association with Eric Clapton, starting in 1969 with Delaney and Bonnie and Friends and continuing in 1970 with Derek and the Dominos, recording with drummer Jim Gordon, guitarist Duane Allman, and keyboardist Bobby Whitlock. In 1970, Radle joined Joe Cocker's Mad Dogs and Englishmen tour. He worked on all of Clapton's solo projects from 1970 until 1979 and was a member of Clapton's touring band, Eric Clapton & His Band, from 1974 to 1979. Radle was instrumental in facilitating Clapton's return to recording and touring in 1974. During Clapton's three-year hiatus, Radle furnished him with a supply of tapes of musicians with whom he had been working. Dick Sims and Jamie Oldaker were the core of Clapton's band during the 1970s. Radle served as more than a sideman, acting also as arranger on several songs, notably "Motherless Children". Radle earned credit as an associate producer of Clapton's album No Reason to Cry.
Carl also was a member of the psychedelic cult band from Dot records ‘Colours’ to which he was on the first and guest appeared on the second album 

Radle was a session musician for many of the most famous blues rock and rock and roll artists in the 1970s, including Rita Coolidge and Kris Kristofferson. He appeared in the film The Concert for Bangladesh; recordings from that concert were released as an album in 1972. Over the two-year period before the release of the album The Concert for Bangladesh, Radle recorded albums with Dave Mason, J.J. Cale, George Harrison, Joe Cocker, Leon Russell, and Buddy Guy, among others. He was the bass player in Gary Lewis & the Playboys when they appeared on the Mike Douglas Show and the Ed Sullivan Show. He can be seen in Martin Scorsese's 1978 film The Last Waltz, which documented the final concert of The Band, held in 1976.

Over the course of his career, Radle played on a number of gold and platinum singles and albums and garnered the respect of many musicians. His bass lines were often simple and repetitive, but always with the purpose of supporting the song.

Radle was born in Tulsa, Oklahoma, and died at his home in Claremore in May 1980, from the effects of alcohol and narcotics; he was 37.

Discography

With Derek and the Dominos 
 1970 Layla and Other Assorted Love Songs
 1973 In Concert
 1990 The Layla Sessions: 20th Anniversary Edition
 1994 Live at the Fillmore

With Eric Clapton 
 1970 Eric Clapton
 1974 461 Ocean Boulevard
 1975 E. C. Was Here
 1975 There's One in Every Crowd
 1976 No Reason to Cry
 1977 Slowhand
 1978 Backless

References

External links 
MP3.com entry on Radle
A Lesson in Carl Radle's Style
Carl Radle Bass Lines

1942 births
1980 deaths
Musicians from Tulsa, Oklahoma
Blues musicians from Oklahoma
American rock bass guitarists
Derek and the Dominos members
Delaney & Bonnie & Friends members
Alcohol-related deaths in Oklahoma
Drug-related deaths in Oklahoma
American session musicians
20th-century American bass guitarists
Guitarists from Oklahoma
American male bass guitarists
20th-century American male musicians